This is a list of seasons completed by the Jacksonville State Gamecocks football team of the National Collegiate Athletic Association (NCAA) Division I Football Championship Subdivision (FCS). Jacksonville State's first football team was fielded in 1904.

Jacksonville State originally competed as a football independent. In 1970, Jacksonville State dropped down to NCAA Division II and joined the Gulf South Conference, where they won a national championship in 1992. The Gamecocks moved to the Division I-AA's Southland Conference in 1996, before joining the Ohio Valley Conference in 2003, of which it has been a member since.

Seasons
Statistics correct as of the end of the 2015 college football season (12 games)

References

Jacksonville State

Jacksonville State Gamecocks football seasons